Asbolane is a manganese (IV) oxy-hydroxide mineral containing also cobalt, nickel, magnesium, and calcium ions. It crystallizes in the hexagonal crystal system.

Naming
It is named after the Greek word for "soil like soot".

References

Hydroxide minerals